Salvadoran Lenca was spoken in Chilanga and Potón. Lencans had arrived in El Salvador about 2,000 years B.C.E and founded the site of Quelepa.  One speaker remains in Potón.

Salvadoran Lenca is of the small language family of Lencan languages that consists of two languages one of which is the Salvadoran Lenca and the Honduran Lenca. There have been attempts to link the Lencan languages to other languages within their groupings, but there has been no success.

Phonology

Consonants

Vowels

Lenca Potón 
As of 2012, Mario Salvador Hernández of Guatajiagua is the last speaker of Lenca Potón, which differs from the version spoken in Chilanga, where the language has disappeared. Research in 2004 by the University of Central America recorded 380 words, five vowels and 16 consonants, alternation between “g” and “k”, with reduplication to create plurals from singular forms.

References

Del Río Urrutía, Ximena. 1999. El lenca de Chilanga. Revista de Filología y Lingüística de la Universidad de Costa Rica 25. 193-209.
 Campbell, Lyle. 1976.  "The Last Lenca". International Journal of American Linguistics 42(1): 73–78.

Extinct languages
Languages of El Salvador
Language revival
Lencan languages